Sytia Messer is an American women's college basketball coach.

Career
She is the head coach of the UCF Knights women's basketball program. She was the head women's basketball coach at Tennessee Technological University from 2009 to 2012, compiling a record of 54–41. From 2012 to 2014, she was associate head coach at the Georgia Institute of Technology.

Head coaching record

References

External links
 Baylor profile

Year of birth missing (living people)
Living people
American women's basketball coaches
Arkansas Razorbacks women's basketball players
Arkansas State Red Wolves women's basketball coaches
Basketball coaches from Arkansas
Basketball players from Arkansas
Baylor Bears women's basketball coaches
Georgia Tech Yellow Jackets women's basketball coaches
LSU Lady Tigers basketball coaches
Memphis Tigers women's basketball coaches
People from Waldo, Arkansas
Tennessee Tech Golden Eagles women's basketball coaches
UCF Knights women's basketball coaches